The Sich Rada (Sichova Rada) was the highest branch of government of the Zaporozhian Cossacks, and based at their center, the Zaporizhian Sich. It was also called Viyskova Rada (Military Council). The Rada, a type of governing committee but with participation from the cossack members, was involved in legislative, executive and judicial matters.

Functions

As an institution, the Sich Rada was a form of direct democracy where rights of individual cossacks were preserved through participation in the Rada.

It was able to decide when to go to war and when to conclude a peace treaty. It elected the officer staff (starshyna), with the Kosh otaman at its head. It received foreign diplomats and determined the course of diplomatic relations.

The Sich Rada also fulfilled certain economic functions, such as the distribution of the communal agricultural and fishing districts among the kurins of the Sich.

Notes and references

Cossack Rada
Zaporizhian Sich